Niuean pertains to anything of, from or related to Niue, an island nation located in the South Pacific Ocean.
 A person from Niue, or of Niuean descent. (See Demographics of Niue)
 The Niuean language
 Niuean cuisine

See also 
 

Language and nationality disambiguation pages